Two-time defending champions Nick Taylor and David Wagner defeated Johan Andersson and Peter Norfolk in the final, 7–5, 7–6(7–4) to win the quad doubles wheelchair tennis title at the 2010 US Open.

Main draw

Final

References
 Main Draw

Wheelchair Quad Doubles
U.S. Open, 2010 Wheelchair Quad Doubles